The 2005 Esiliiga is the 15th season of the Esiliiga, second-highest Estonian league for association football clubs, since its establishment in 1992.

JK Pärnu Vaprus gained automatic promotion to the Meistriliiga. FC Ajax Lasnamäe also went up after winning the promotion/relegation play-off against FC Kuressaare.
The league's top-scorer was FC Ajax Lasnamäe youngster Nikita Andreev with 29 goals.

Final table of Esiliiga season 2005

Promotion/relegation playoff 

FC Ajax Lasnamäe beat FC Kuressaare 2–2 on away goals rule. Ajax Lasnamäe promoted to Meistriliiga, Kuressaare relegated to Esiliiga.

Season statistics

Top goalscorers
As of 1 December 2005.

See also
 2005 Meistriliiga

References

Esiliiga seasons
2
Estonia
Estonia